Giannis Mangos (born 26 July 1982) is a Greek professional football manager and former player.

References

1982 births
Living people
Greek footballers
Proodeftiki F.C. players
Anagennisi Karditsa F.C. players
Greek football managers
Anagennisi Karditsa F.C. managers
O.F. Ierapetra F.C. managers
Footballers from Karditsa
Association football midfielders
20th-century Greek people
21st-century Greek people